Franz Ulrich, 11th Prince Kinsky of Wchinitz and Tettau (7 October 19362 April 2009) was the titular pretender Prince Kinsky of Wchinitz and Tettau as well the head of the House of Kinsky.

Early life
Franz Ulrich was born at Vienna, Federal State of Austria youngest son of Ulrich, 10th Prince Kinsky of Wchinitz and Tettau by his second marriage with Baroness Marie Julia Mathilde von dem Bussche-Haddenhausen. He became the titular Prince upon the death of his father in 1938. He was first cousin of Countess Marie Aglaë Kinsky of Wchinitz and Tettau that later became Princess consort of Liechtenstein, and second cousin of Claus von Amsberg, Prince consort of Queen Beatrix of the Netherlands, both being descendants of Baron Julius von dem Bussche-Haddenhausen.

In 1940 he emigrated with his mother to Argentina where he lived until his death. In 1942 Franz Ulrich inherited several estates from the Kinsky family, including the Kinsky Palace in Old Town Square in Prague. These properties were withdrawn from him in 1945 on the basis of the Beneš decrees. Since 2003, Franz Ulrich complained against various Czech courts for the return of the assets. In total there are 157 lawsuits filed in the dispute of € 1.3 billion. The European Court of Human Rights held that his right to a fair trial (article 6 § 1 of the Convention) had been violated.

Marriage and family
Franz Ulrich married on 14 April 1965 in Buenos Aires to Roberta Cavanagh (1942–2002), daughter of Roberto Cavanagh and his wife, Anne Rowell. The divorced on 25 April 1977.

They had one son:
Karl, 12th Prince Kinsky of Wchinitz and Tettau (born 10 January 1967), married in 2000 to Maria de las Dolores Beccar Varela; had issue.

He married secondly on 24 October 1977 in Paris to Countess Helena Hutten-Czapska (born 1941), daughter of Count Stanislaus Hutten-Czapski and Verena Narkiewicz-Jodko, they had no issue. She died in 2012.

After Kinsky's death, his son and Helen Hutten Czapski entered a great dispute for Kinsky's properties. The Civil Judge Nº 103 is in charge of the claims.

Later life
The Prince died on 2 April 2009, aged 72. In 2012, some of his jewel collection was auctioned by Sothebys.

Ancestry

Notes and sources
Genealogisches Handbuch des Adels, Fürstliche Häuser, Reference: 1984 450

References 

1936 births
2009 deaths
House of Kinsky
Nobility from Vienna
People from Buenos Aires
Argentine nobility
Austrian emigrants to Argentina